Eupholus bennetti is a species of beetle belonging to the  family Curculionidae.

Description
This quite variable species is usually blue or green, with two longitudinal black bands along the pronotum and the elytra. The blue-green colour derives from very small scales. The top of the antennae is black.

Distribution
This species can be found in lowland rainforests of Papua New Guinea.

Etymology
The scientific name commemorates the Australian naturalist George Bennett

References

 Biolib
 Universal Biological Indexer
 Eupholus bennetti
 Insect Company

Entiminae
Beetles described in 1876